Manvir Singh may refer to:

 Manvir Singh (footballer, born 2001)
 Manvir Singh (footballer, born 1995)
 Manbir Singh Chaheru (1959–1987), founder and first leader of the organization Khalistan Commando Force